Alfred Machin (20 April 1877 – 16 June 1929) was a French actor and film director. He is remembered to have been one of the few French film directors whose films expressed progressive tendencies before World War I. He was also a pioneer of aerial filming. After 1920 Alfred Machin devoted himself to films of animals.

Machin started his career as a press photographer for the magazine L'illustration. He was then recruited by the film production company Pathé which sent him in 1907 to Africa where he realised in particular a large number of short films on wild animals.

Machin was sent in 1909 by Pathé to The Netherlands to film scenes of Dutch life. In 1912, he was sent to Belgium where he took part in the creation of Pathé foreign subsidiary Belge Cinéma Film and directed a number of films including Belgium's first feature film Le Diamant noir (:fr) and the anti-war film Maudite soit la guerre.

During World War I, Machin took part in the foundation of the Photographic Service of the French Army while continuing working for Pathé which produced films for this service. He shot some scenes of the French trenches which were used by D.W. Griffith in Hearts of the World He only directed one horror film, The Manor House of Fear in 1927, which is thought to have been theatrically shown in the United States by Universal Pictures.

After the war, Machin created a Film studio in Nice, to which a small zoo was attached where he kept wild animals used in his productions. He died in 1929 as a result of an injury inflicted by a panther during the shooting of a film.

Machin directed 156 films, of which 32 are preserved.

Selected filmography

1909: Le Moulin maudit (:fr)
1911: Le Dévouement d'un gosse (:fr)
1913: Le Diamant noir (:fr)
1914: La Fille de Delft AKA La Tulipe d'or (:fr)
1914: Maudite soit la guerre
1924: The Heirs of Uncle James
1927: The Manor House of Fear (starring Romuald Joube)

References

External links

1877 births
1929 deaths
French film directors
Articles containing video clips